The Punjab Legal Services Authority is a statutory organization in  Punjab State, India, founded in 1998 to provide legal aid in the state.

References

External links

Legal organisations based in India
Government of Punjab, India
Legal aid